The John C. Gifford Arboretum is an arboretum and botanical garden located on the campus of the University of Miami in Coral Gables, Florida.

History
The arboretum was founded in 1947 Frank J. Rimoldi and Roy Woodbury. In 1949, it was named for University of Miami professor John C. Gifford, an expert on tropical woods and professor of tropical forestry at the University of Miami. In 1950, the Gifford Society of Tropical Botany was formed to promote study of tropical plants, and the arboretum grew to more than 500 plants.

The garden is divided into several exhibits, including one dedicated to the plants domesticated by the Mayans.

Development and preservation
Coral Gables resident Kathryn Gaubatz has been an active force in working to preserve and protect the John C. Gifford Arboretum from future development. In 2005, the Coral Gables City Commission voted to approve the construction of a road within the Coral Gables campus to ease traffic off of San Amaro Drive, US 1, and Granada Boulevard, the three main streets that encircle the  campus and therefore handle the vast majority of vehicular traffic coming and leaving from the University of Miami.

Access
The University of Miami campus is served by Miami Metrorail at University Station.

External links
 Official website

Arboreta in Florida
Botanical gardens in Florida
Coral Gables, Florida
Protected areas of Miami-Dade County, Florida
University of Miami
1947 establishments in Florida
Protected areas established in 1947